The war for talent is a term coined by Steven Hankin of McKinsey & Company in 1997, and a book by Ed Michaels, Helen Handfield-Jones, and Beth Axelrod, Harvard Business Press, 2001 . The war for talent refers to an increasingly competitive landscape for recruiting and retaining talented employees. In the book, Michaels, et al., describe not a set of superior Human Resources processes, but a mindset that emphasizes the importance of talent to the success of organizations.

Demographic 
The war for talent is intensified by demographic shifts (primarily in the United States and Europe). This is characterized by increasing demand along with decreasing supply (demographically). There are simply fewer post-baby-boom workers to replace the baby-boom retirement in the US and Europe (though this is not the case in most of East Asia, Southeast Asia, Central Asia, Central America, South America, or the Middle East; Eastern Europe also tends to have similar demographics, namely an aging and/or shrinking labor force).

Knowledge work 
While talent is vague or ill-defined, the underlying assumption is that for knowledge-intensive industries, the knowledge worker (a term coined by Peter Drucker) is the key competitive resource (see the Resource-based view of the firm). Knowledge-based theories of organizations consistently place knowledge workers as a primary, competitive resource.

Definition of talent 

Talent is never explicitly defined in the book, though the Preface notes, "A certain part of talent elude description: You  simply know it when you see it." (p. xii)  After several further caveats, the authors go on: "We can say, however, that managerial talent is some combination of a sharp strategic mind, leadership ability, emotional maturity, communications skills,  the ability to attract and inspire other talented people, entrepreneurial instincts, functional skills, and the ability to deliver results."  (p. xiii) The authors offer no outside support for this assertion.

A 2006 article in The Economist, which mentions the book, notes that, "companies do not even know how to define “talent”, let alone how to manage it. Some use it to mean people like Aldous Huxley's alphas in “Brave New World”—those at the top of the bell curve. Others employ it as a synonym for the entire workforce, a definition so broad as to be meaningless."

Relevance during economic downturn 
The 'War for talent is seen by various sources as becoming irrelevant during economic downturns. However, there have been highly visible talent poaching by solvent firms of others who have economic hardship (e.g., JP Morgan was raided by a European firm in March, 2009).

See also 
 Talent management
 Aptitude

References

External links

 The War for Talent, by Ed Michaels, Helen Handfield-Jones, and Beth Axelrod, Harvard Business Press, 2001 
 The War for Talent is Back, Robert Sutton, April 23, 2007
 The War for Talent, Fast Company, December 18, 2007
 The War for Talent II: 7 Ways to Win, Fast Company, December 19, 2007
 The Axeman Cometh, The Economist, November 4, 2008
 The War for Talent Placed on Hold, Hotels Magazine, March 1, 2009
 Cease Fire in the War for Talent, Chief Learning Officer, March 2009
 The War for Talent is First Casualty of the Crisis, Financial Times, April 13, 2009 (paywall)

Human resource management